A design sprint is a time-constrained, five-phase process that uses design thinking with the aim of reducing the risk when bringing a new product, service or a feature to the market. The process aims to help teams to clearly define goals, validate assumptions and decide on a product roadmap before starting development. It seeks to address strategic issues using interdisciplinary expertise, rapid prototyping, and usability testing. This design process is similar to Sprints in an Agile development cycle.

How it started 

There are multiple origins to the concept of mixing Agile and Design Thinking. 
The most popular was developed by a multi-disciplinary team working out of Google Ventures. The initial iterations of the approach were created by Jake Knapp, and popularised by a series of blog articles outlining the approach and reporting on its successes within Google. As it gained industry recognition, the approach was further refined and added to by other Google staff including Braden Kowitz, Michael Margolis, John Zeratsky and Daniel Burkareal.

It was later published in a book published by Google Ventures called .

Possible uses 

Claimed uses of the approach include

 Launching a new product or a service.
 Extending an existing experience to a new platform.
 Existing MVP needing revised User experience design and/or UI Design.
 Adding new features and functionality to a digital product.
 Opportunities for improvement of a product (e.g. a high rate of cart abandonment)
 Opportunities for improvement of a service.
 Supporting organizations in their transformation towards new technologies (e.g., AI).

Phases 

The creators of the design sprint approach, recommend preparation by picking the proper team, environment, materials and tools working with six key 'ingredients'. 
 Understand: Discover the business opportunity, the audience, the competition, the value proposition, and define metrics of success.
 Diverge: Explore, develop and iterate creative ways of solving the problem, regardless of feasibility.
 Converge: Identify ideas that fit the next product cycle and explore them in further detail through storyboarding.
 Prototype: Design and prepare prototype(s) that can be tested with people.
 Test: Conduct 1:1 usability testing with 5-6 people from the product's primary target audience. Ask good questions.

Deliverables 
The main deliverables after the Design sprint:
 Answers to a set of vital questions
 Findings from the sprint (notes, user journey maps, storyboards, information architecture diagrams, etc.)
 Prototypes
 Report from the usability testing with the findings (backed by testing videos)
 A plan for next steps
 Validate or invalidate hypotheses before committing resources to build the solution

Team 
The suggested ideal number of people involved in the sprint is 4-7 people and they include the facilitator, designer, a decision maker (often a CEO if the company is a startup), product manager, engineer and someone from companies core business departments (Marketing, Content, Operations, etc.).

Variants 
The concept sprint is a fast five-day process for cross-functional teams to brainstorm, define, and model new approaches to business issue. Another common variant is the Service Design Sprint, an approach to Design Sprints created in 2014 that uses Service Design tools and mechanics to tackle service innovation.

References 

Design
Software development process
Agile software development